The Brewster Whitecaps are a collegiate summer baseball team based in Brewster, Massachusetts. The team is a member of the Cape Cod Baseball League (CCBL) and plays in the league's East Division. The Whitecaps play their home games at Stony Brook Field on the campus of Stony Brook Elementary School in Brewster. 

The Whitecaps most recently won the CCBL championship in 2021 when they defeated the Bourne Braves two games to none to win the best of three championship series. The title was the third in team history, having won previously in 2000 and 2017. The Whitecaps and the Bourne Braves joined the CCBL in 1988 as expansion teams, bringing the number of teams in the league to its current ten. The team has been led since 2015 by Keystone College field manager Jamie Shevchik.

History

Pre-modern era

Early years
Organized baseball in the town of Brewster, Massachusetts dates to the late 1800s. In 1886, the Brewster town team defeated the "Yarmouth Grays", 11–9, in a July 3 contest that featured a rare triple play turned by Brewster. The Brewster squad, reportedly bolstered by collegiate talent, had earlier swept a home-and-home series against Harwich.

In the 1910s, the Brewster chapter of the Improved Order of Red Men sponsored a baseball team known as the "Red Tops", a club that was "an aggregation of young college men." The Red Tops played a series of three games against their counterparts from East Dennis in 1911 that attracted large crowds. In 1915 and 1916, the Red Tops were captained by Dartmouth College's Albert F. Rice, and the team's annual contest against the Brewster town team was a main attraction at the Brewster Grange fair.

The early Cape League era (1923–1939)
In 1923, the Cape Cod Baseball League was formed and initially included four teams: Falmouth, Chatham, Osterville, and Hyannis. This early Cape League operated through the 1939 season and disbanded in 1940, due in large part to the difficulty of securing ongoing funding during the Great Depression.

During this period, teams from various towns moved in and out of the league each season. The Brewster Athletic Association was formed in 1932, but did not enter a team in the Cape League during this era. In 1933, the Brewster A.A. joined the newly-formed Lower Cape Twilight League under manager Howard Dunnells. Tragedy touched the Brewster team twice early on, as manager Dunnells died suddenly after the 1933 season, and early in the 1934 season umpire John Demotte, stepson of novelist Charles Neville Buck, was killed by a foul ball during a game between Brewster and Orleans at Eldredge Park.

The Upper and Lower Cape League era (1946–1962)

The Cape League was revived after World War II, and was originally composed of 11 teams across Upper Cape and Lower Cape divisions. Brewster began play in the Cape League in 1948, entering the Lower Cape Division as its sixth team, along with Orleans, Chatham, Harwich, Yarmouth, and Dennis.

After the 1951 season, Brewster withdrew from the league, but was back in 1956, and remained in the league through the 1960 season. In 1958, undefeated world heavyweight champion and Brockton, Massachusetts native Rocky Marciano was in the stands to cheer on his younger brother Pete, who played catcher for Brewster.

Modern era (1963–present)

The 1980s and the birth of the Whitecaps

Throughout the 1960s and 1970s, Brewster did not field a team in the Cape League. In 1988, the league added Brewster and Bourne as expansion teams, bringing the number of teams in the league to its current ten. The Brewster entry was dubbed the "Whitecaps", a moniker suggested by Brewster native William Turkington and inspired by "the wind marching the waves steadily across Cape Cod Bay."

Baseball Hall of Famer Stan Musial came to town in early 1988 to help raise funds for the new franchise, and Brewster's Ocean Edge Resort brought Boston Celtics star and NBA Hall of Famer Kevin McHale to toss a ceremonial first pitch in July. The Whitecaps played their home games at Cape Cod Regional Technical High School, just over the border in Harwich. The use of Cape Cod Tech was intended to be temporary, but continued through 2005.

The 1988 Whitecaps team was led by skipper Joe Walsh, and featured future major leaguers Mike Myers and F.P. Santangelo. The undisputed star of the team was slugging first baseman Dave Staton. Staton ushered in the Whitecaps era with an opening-day performance marked by two home runs and six RBI. In a season when the CCBL featured a glut of future major league talent, including sluggers such as Frank Thomas and Mo Vaughn, Staton led all with 16 homers and 46 RBI, and was named league MVP. He posted a .772 slugging percentage, and missed capturing the league's triple crown by just two points, his .359 average falling just shy of Chuck Knoblauch's .361 mark. Staton was inducted into the CCBL Hall of Fame in 2004.

After posting a respectable 17–25 record in its inaugural season, Brewster qualified for the postseason in only its second year. The 1989 team was piloted by Rolando Casanova, and finished the regular season tied with Chatham for second place in the East Division. Brewster overcame the A's in a single-game play-in contest, but went on to fall to first place Y-D in the semi-final series, two games to none.

The 1990s

Brewster's 1992 team starred CCBL Hall of Fame pitcher Billy Wagner, who fanned 79 batters in 44.1 innings of work, and was named the league's Outstanding Pro Prospect. Whitecap players took home hardware as East Division MVP's of the CCBL All-Star Game in three consecutive seasons, as Will Scalzitti claimed the honors in 1991, Wagner in 1992, and Geoff Blum in 1993.

Manager Bill Mosiello's 1994 Whitecaps squad starred CCBL Hall of Famer Sean Casey, who hit .338 with 40 RBI, and led all first basemen with a .993 fielding percentage. Casey finished the season with an 11-game hitting streak during which he maintained a torrid .488 pace at the plate. The team reached the playoffs and disposed of Orleans two games to one in the semi-finals to give the Whitecaps their first berth in the CCBL title series, where they were eventually downed by Wareham in two straight games. 

Mosiello's club finished in first place in the East Division in 1996 and 1998, but were bounced in the semi-finals both seasons by Chatham. The 1996 team featured league Outstanding Relief Pitcher Drew Fischer, who posted 13 saves on the season, and David Ross, who later became a fan favorite of the hometown Boston Red Sox and played a key role in Boston's 2013 World Series title. The 1998 Whitecaps featured future major league all-star Chase Utley and CCBL Hall of Famer Bobby Kielty. Kielty was tops in the league with a .384 average, clubbing six home runs with 45 RBI and was named the league MVP.

The 2000s: A first championship and a homecoming to Brewster

Brewster began the 2000s in dramatic fashion by claiming its first league championship. Led by manager Dave Lawn, the 2000 Whitecaps went 28–16 in the regular season, finishing atop the East Division. Pitching coach Pat Shine took over managerial duties when Lawn left with a week remaining in the regular season to take a coaching job at USC. The Whitecaps were led by league batting champ Steve Stanley (.329) and the league's Outstanding Relief Pitcher, Dan Rich. In the playoffs, Brewster defeated Chatham two games to one to advance to the championship series. 

Facing Hyannis for the title, the Whitecaps relied on a mixture of pitching and small ball. In Game 1 at Cape Tech, Whitecap lefty hurler Ryan Olson kept the Mets at bay through eight innings, allowing only five hits. Brewster capitalized on a pair of walks in the seventh to score the game's only two runs. Behind the solid work of starter Mike Wodnicki in Game 2, Brewster combined a mix of bunts, walks and stolen bases to build an early 5–0 lead on a drizzly day in Hyannis. The Whitecaps held on to a 6–2 victory to complete the series sweep and take home the title. Playoff MVP honors went to Brewster's Jack Headley, who made a key catch in the field to preserve the Game 1 victory, and went 5-for-18 at the plate in the title series.

In 2002, the Whitecaps featured exciting San Diego State University centerfielder Tony Gwynn Jr., son of Baseball Hall of Famer Tony Gwynn. Skipper Bob Macaluso took the Whitecaps' helm in 2003 and guided the club to the playoffs in three of his six years at the post. Macaluso's 2003 club finished in first place in the East Division and featured league Outstanding Relief Pitcher Jarrett Santos and CCBL Hall of Famer J.C. Holt. Holt recorded a 21-game hitting streak during the season, and went on to wear the league batting crown with a .388 mark.

The Whitecaps boasted the league's batting champ for a second consecutive season in 2004 when Ryan Patterson hit at a .327 clip. The 2004 team also included future major league all-star Ryan Braun, as well as the CCBL's Outstanding Pitcher Matt Goyen, who posted a 5–2 mark with a 1.25 ERA and 80 strikeouts, including an 18-strikeout game at Orleans.

The Whitecaps came home to Brewster in 2006, as a grant from the Yawkey Foundation and matching funds from the team allowed for the construction of a field behind Stony Brook Elementary School. The 2006 team featured CCBL Hall of Famer Shaun Seibert, who posted a 6–0 record with a microscopic 0.39 ERA and was co-recipient of the league's Outstanding Pitcher Award.

The 2010s: Brewster claims a second title

Brewster qualified for the postseason in six of ten years in the 2010s. The 2012 Whitecaps featured future major league all-stars Jeff McNeil and Aaron Judge. Judge, a towering 6-foot-7 slugger, clouted 5 homers and batted .270 for Brewster. In 2014, Whitecap Wade Wass set CCBL single game records by crushing two grand slams and driving in nine runs against Wareham in a game nationally telecast by Fox College Sports.

Manager Jamie Shevchik joined the Whitecaps in 2015, and led the club to a second-place finish and playoff berth in his first campaign. The 2015 team featured league Outstanding Relief Pitcher Thomas Hackimer and all-star third baseman Nick Senzel, who hit .364 and took home both the league MVP and Outstanding Pro Prospect awards.

In 2017, Brewster finished the regular season 21–21–2 and faced three-time defending champion Yarmouth-Dennis in the first round of the playoffs. The Whitecaps upset the Red Sox with an 8–7, extra inning, Game 3 win on the road. With the victory, Brewster claimed its first postseason series since 2000, and advanced to the East Division championship against top-seeded Orleans. The Whitecaps again pulled off the upset in dramatic fashion on the road in game three, this time relying on late signee Conor McNamara from Marist College to pitch seven innings before a go-ahead 8th inning home run by Marty Costes from the University of Maryland gave Brewster a 2–1 win. 

In the championship series, Brewster faced Bourne in a matchup of the 1988 expansion clubs. The Whitecaps won Game 1 at home on a walk-off hit-by-pitch in the tenth, then fell to Bourne on the road in Game 2, 13–7, to set up a decisive game three. Whitecaps starter Will Tribucher twirled six and two-thirds shutout innings, and Hunter Bishop delivered the decisive blow, hammering his third home run of the playoffs to put Brewster up 2–0 in the sixth. The score was preserved by a diving catch on the warning track by Costes with the bases loaded and two outs in the top of the seventh, and Brewster hung on to win by the 2–0 tally to secure its second league championship. Bishop shared playoff MVP honors with Nick Dunn, who batted .500 in the championship series.

The Whitecaps' stars shone brighter than all at the 2019 CCBL All-Star Game. Prior to the game, Brewster third baseman Tyler Hardman slugged his way to victory in the home run derby. Brewster's Brett Auerbach and Gage Workman were named game co-MVPs for the East Division, with Auerbach delivering the ninth-inning walk-off RBI single to win the game for the East, 6–5.

The 2020s: A third Whitecaps championship
The 2020 CCBL season was cancelled due to the coronavirus pandemic, and the Whitecaps were dealt an additional blow as former skipper John Altobelli was among the nine killed in the helicopter crash that claimed the life of NBA legend Kobe Bryant.

The 2021 Whitecaps finished in first place atop the East Division, and faced Harwich in the playoff semi-finals. In Game 1 at home, Brewster outfielder Chad Castillo went 3-for-4 with a double and two RBIs that accounted for all the scoring as Whitecap hurlers Brian Fitzpatrick, Michael Prosecky and closer Dale Stanavich combined for the 2–0 shutout win. Brewster got a homer from Tony Bullard early in Game 2 at Whitehouse Field, and was tied with the Mariners, 4–4, going to the top of the ninth. With the bases full of Whitecaps, a balk call brought in the go-ahead run, and Stanavich came on in the bottom of the inning to strike out the side and send Brewster to the CCBL title series. Facing a powerful Bourne club in a rematch of the 2017 finals, the Whitecaps came away from Doran Park with a familiar-looking 2–0 Game 1 shutout win, as Griffin Green combined with Prosecky and Stanavich to hold the Braves scoreless, while Kurtis Byrne's two-run double accounted for the game's only runs. Hoping to complete the series sweep in Game 2 at Stony Brook Field, Brewster trailed early, 5–0, after a Bourne first-inning explosion. Whitecap Zachary Neto answered with a homer in the bottom of the frame, and Brewster proceeded to chip away at the Braves' lead. With the score knotted at 6–6 after six, Bullard blasted a home run to lead off a four-run Caps seventh, and Brewster held on to clinch the championship with a 10–6 win. Castillo took home playoff MVP honors, batting .400 for the postseason with three runs and three RBI.

The Whitecaps reached the finals again in 2022 and faced the Bourne Braves for a second consecutive season, but Bourne exacted its revenge as former Brewster pitching coach Scott Landers skippered the Braves to a two-game sweep of the Caps.

CCBL Hall of Fame inductees

The CCBL Hall of Fame and Museum is a history museum and hall of fame honoring past players, coaches, and others who have made outstanding contributions to the CCBL. Below are the inductees who spent all or part of their time in the Cape League with Brewster.

Notable alumni

David Adams 2006
Scott Alexander 2009
Yonder Alonso 2007–2008
Garvin Alston 1990–1991
John Andreoli 2010
Mike Avilés 2002
Roger Bailey 1991
Brian Bannister 2001
Luke Bard 2010–2011
Brian Barden 2001
Jake Barrett 2010
Aaron Bates  2005
Buddy Baumann 2008
Todd Belitz 1995
Rigo Beltrán 1989–1990
Erik Bennett 1988
Jon Berti 2010
Joe Biagini 2011
Braden Bishop 2014
Hunter Bishop 2017–2018
Brian Bixler 2003
Geoff Blum 1993
Brennan Boesch 2005
Ryan Braun 2004
Brian Buchanan 1993
David Buchanan 2010
Andy Burns 2010
Dan Butler 2009
Mark Canha 2009
Cesar Carrillo 2004
Matt Carson 2001
Sean Casey 1994
J. T. Chargois 2011
Frank Charles 1989–1990
Rocky Cherry 2000
Nick Christiani 2008
Ryan Cook 2007
David Cooper 2006–2007
Caleb Cotham 2008–2009
Collin Cowgill 2006
Gavin Cross 2021
Brad Davis 2002
Erik Davis 2006–2007
Taylor Davis 2011
Cole De Vries 2006
Dustin Delucchi 1997
Reid Detmers 2018
Chris Dickerson 2002
Danny Dorn 2005
Brandon Duckworth 1997
Barry Enright 2006
Paul Failla 1992
Taylor Featherston 2010
Ryan Feltner 2016
Paco Figueroa 2003
Mike Freeman 2008
Drew Gagnon 2010
Brad Glenn 2007
Erik Goeddel 2009
David Goforth 2009
Yasmani Grandal 2008
Rick Greene 1990
Seth Greisinger 1994–1995
Pedro Grifol 1990–1991
Jason Grilli 1996
Tony Gwynn Jr. 2002
Jedd Gyorko 2009
Ryon Healy 2012
Scott Heineman 2013
Kyle Hendricks 2010
Matt Herges 1990
Bryan Holaday 2009
Bryce Hubbart 2021
Colt Hynes 2006
Justin James 2002
Jon Jay 2005
Mark Johnson 1994
Reed Johnson 1998
Spencer Jones 2021
Aaron Judge 2012
Tommy Kahnle 2010
Jake Kalish 2012
Ty Kelly 2008
Bobby Kielty 1998
Scott Kingery 2014
Matt LaPorta 2006
Brandon Leibrandt 2013
Michael Lorenzen 2012
Zac Lowther 2016
Matt Macri 2003
Scott Maine 2006
Tommy Manzella 2003
Michael Massey 2018
Jack Mayfield 2011
Kade McClure 2016
Jeff McNeil 2012
Adam Melhuse 1992
Ben Meyer 2013
Matt Mikulski 2019
Bobby Miller 2018
Tyson Miller 2015
Sam Moll 2012
Chad Mottola 1991
Lyle Mouton 1990
Colton Murray 2010
Mike Myers 1988–1989
Zach Neto 2021
Mike Neu 1998–1999
Augie Ojeda 1994
Craig Paquette 1988
Jarrett Parker 2009
Eduardo Pérez 1989
Konnor Pilkington 2016
Cody Ponce 2014
Jason Rakers 1993
Anthony Ranaudo 2010
Gary Rath 1993
Kyle Regnault 2009
Will Rhymes 2004
Kenny Robinson 1991
Jacob Robson 2015
Andrew Romine 2006
Brent Rooker 2016
David Ross 1996
Mike Rouse 2000
Aaron Rowand 1996–1997
Gaby Sánchez 2004
F. P. Santangelo 1988
Nick Senzel 2015
Andy Sheets 1991
Jordan Sheffield 2015
Terrmel Sledge 1997
Chad Smith 2010
Tyler Smith 2012
Will Smith 2015
Sean Spencer 1995
Dave Staton 1988
Drew Steckenrider 2011
Jonathan Stiever 2017
Travis Swaggerty 2017
Taylor Tankersley 2002
Blake Tekotte 2007
Mark Thompson 1991
Zack Thompson 2018
Tyler Thornburg 2009
Jayce Tingler 2002
Andrew Toles 2011
Steve Tolleson 2004
Mike Tonis 1998
Chase Utley 1998
Austin Voth 2011–2012
LaMonte Wade 2014
Billy Wagner 1992
Steele Walker 2017
Todd Walker 1992
Colin Walsh 2009
P. J. Walters 2005
Logan Warmoth 2016
Adam Warren 2007
Dusty Wathan 1994
Luke Weaver 2012
Kip Wells 1997
Ryan Wheeler 2008
Eli White 2015
Sean White 2002
Tyler Zuber 2016

Yearly results

Results by season, 1948–1960

* Regular seasons split into first and second halves are designated as (A) and (B).

Results by season, 1988–present

League award winners

(*) - Indicates co-recipient

All-Star Game selections

Italics - Indicates All-Star Game Home Run Hitting Contest participant

No-hit games

Managerial history

(*) - Season count excludes 2020 CCBL season cancelled due to coronavirus pandemic.

See also
 Brewster Whitecaps players

References

External links

Rosters

 2000
 2001
 2002
 2003
 2004
 2005
 2006
 2007
 2008
 2009
 2010
 2011
 2012
 2013
 2014
 2015
 2016
 2017
 2018
 2019
 2021
 2022

Other links
Brewster Whitecaps official site
CCBL Home Page

Cape Cod Baseball League teams
Amateur baseball teams in Massachusetts
Brewster, Massachusetts